David Martínez (born December 8, 1981 in Monterrey) is a Mexican racing driver.  He holds the record for the best debut ever by a Mexican driver in a premiere open-wheel series (IndyCar, Champ Car World Series, F1) with his 9th place finish at the 2006 Gran Premio Telmex (a record he now shares with Patricio O'Ward, who also finished 9th on debut at the 2018 Indycar Grand Prix of Sonoma).

Racing career

Early career in Mexico
Starting at the age of seven through his early twenties, Martínez raced in Mexico in karts, Mexican Formula 2/Formula 3000, Formula 3, and Formula Renault 2000 de America. At the age of 14 he won his first formula championship (Mexican Formula 2 Neon), in 1997 Martínez was awarded the Rookie of the Year Award in Mexican Marlboro Cup Formula 3000 and in 2002 won the Mexican Formula Renault 2000. Martínez eventually expanded his racing territory, which included a year in the Barber Dodge Pro Series (2003) winning the first race he participated in (at Fundidora Park in Monterrey, Mexico).

Europe and Atlantic Championship (2004-2006)
In 2004 Martínez migrated to Europe and produced five top-five results in the Formula Renault V6 Eurocup Series. The 25-year-old missed the first race of the year in the 2005 Champ Car Atlantic Championship but still managed to claim fifth in his rookie season. He finished third in his first race in Monterrey, Mexico, captured his first career pole and scored a total of four podiums and seven top-five finishes. Also during 2005, Martínez contested some rounds of the A1 Grand Prix Series.

In 2006 Martínez returned to Atlantics with the US RaceTronics Team, and repeated his fifth place in the championship despite a challenging season in which he switched teams halfway through the year, but still managed to continue his success on Mexican soil by finishing third at the Monterrey, Mexico event.

Champ Car and Indy Lights (2006-present)
In 2006, Martínez joined Forsythe Championship Racing in Mexico City to pilot the Lola-Ford-Cosworth in his Champ Car debut. Initially announced to race a third car for the team, he ended up replacing an injured Paul Tracy and finished 9th, the best debut by a Mexican driver in a premiere open-wheel series. He was idle throughout most of 2007, but was announced as the driver of Forsythe's #7 car for the final two races of the season, including a return to Mexico City.  David started 10th and ran as high as 5th in the race, but during a routine pit stop on lap 45, his gearbox prevented him from returning to the race. The crew managed to repair it, but the job took several minutes and he finished 6 laps down in 14th. Martínez's last Champ Car race came in the series' final race, the 2008 Toyota Grand Prix of Long Beach where he finished a career-best eighth as one of three Forsythe/Petit entries.

In 2009 his only professional outing was in the 24 Hours of Daytona driving Beyer Racing's Riley-Pontiac to a 10th place DP-class finish. In 2010 he re-entered American open-wheel racing by making two starts for Genoa Racing in Firestone Indy Lights with a best finish of 8th at Infineon Raceway.

Racing record

*(1) = Team standings.

American open-wheel racing results
(key)

Barber Dodge Pro Series

Atlantic Championship

Champ Car

IndyCar Series

 1 Run on same day.

Indy Lights

Complete A1 Grand Prix results
(key) (Races in bold indicate pole position) (Races in italics indicate fastest lap)

References

External links
 David Martínez Official Website
 Career statistics at Driver Database

1981 births
Living people
Racing drivers from Nuevo León
Champ Car drivers
Atlantic Championship drivers
Indy Lights drivers
Latin America Formula Renault 2000 drivers
A1 Team Mexico drivers
Sportspeople from Monterrey
24 Hours of Daytona drivers
Barber Pro Series drivers
A1 Grand Prix drivers
IndyCar Series drivers
US RaceTronics drivers
Forsythe Racing drivers
Formula Renault V6 Eurocup drivers
Cram Competition drivers
DAMS drivers
NACAM F4 Championship drivers